Eso-Charis is the eponymous album of the band Eso-Charis. The album was originally released independently in 1998, later being released by Day-Glo Records of Sweden, and even later by Solid State Records, the label of Living Sacrifice, which three of the members were also a part of.

Track listing
"Born with a Future" - 4:16
"Processed Bodies" - 4:27
"Once upon a Fashionable" - 5:00
"The Narrowing List" - 4:31
"Spirit of Revival" - 1:34
"Dunamis" - 4:24
"Skimmers" - 3:06
"The Judas Swing" - 1:41
"Outro" - 1:22

Credits
Jayson Holmes - Guitar, Vocals
Cory Brandan Putman - Guitar, Lead Vocals
Matthew Putman - Drums
Arthur Green - Bass, Vocals
Produced by Bruce Fitzhugh
Mastered by Kent Stump
Mixed by Barry Poynter

References

1998 albums
Eso-Charis albums
Solid State Records albums